This Loud Morning is the second major-label studio album, third overall by American singer-songwriter David Cook. It was released on June 28, 2011, by RCA Records. Executive produced by Matt Serletic, the album featured tracks written and co-written by Cook along with many acclaimed songwriters, including Johnny Rzeznik, David Hodges, Ryan Tedder, Kevin Griffin, Scott Stevens and Marti Frederiksen.

Background
David Cook began to concentrate working on this his second album after his first major tour, the Declaration Tour, concluded in December 2009.  While on the tour, he put down some riffs and lyrical ideas, and started song-writing as a band towards the end of the tour.  He collaborated with a number of songwriters, early collaborators on his song-writing included Matt Squire, Brian Howes, Claude Kelly, Max Martin, Raine Maida, Scott Stevens and John Rzeznik. More than 80 songs were written for the album, and 14 were tracked. He had hoped initially that a single would be ready for release in April 2010 and the album that summer. However, a producer for the album was not announced until May, and recording started in June that year with producer Matt Serletic at the helm.

Before recording, he said he has "lofty ideas" for his second album and described early songs written with Julian Emery and Jim Irvin as having "massive choruses" and "very U2-esque". At the beginning his goal was to make an album that "really, really pushed the concept of dynamic".

Theme
Cook wanted the album to have a loose theme within the record that is open to interpretation by the listener.  He described the opening song "Circadian" as being about "falling asleep and escaping the day, and using sleep as a reprieve", the middle of the album being "the gestation cycle of a relationship from start to finish", and the ending track "Rapid Eye Movement" being about waking up from a dream and having to face actual reality.

Cook revealed "Rapid Eye Movement" was written early on in the writing process, and the song "opened up [his] thought process to the rest of this record". On using sleep and dream as a narrative theme, he added, "I like that romantic idea of living an entire life for yourself while you’re asleep".

Album title
The title of the album is from a line in lyrics from a song on the album called "Rapid Eye Movement" – "Give me one more quiet night, 'fore this loud morning gets it right and does me in."

Reception
AllMusic gave the album 3 out of 5 stars stating that 'This Loud Morning winds up as an album that’s primarily textural mood music for the morning, and one that’s not all that loud either'.  American Songwriter also gave the album 3 out of 5 stars stating that 'This Loud Morning has a much more artistic vibe combined with a rawness evident in Cook’s vocal performances not found on his previous Rob Cavallo produced release. This is refreshing considering Serletic’s meticulous production style often results in songs becoming trapped in immense layers of over produced schlock. The album includes balanced amounts of strings, piano, and crunchy guitar, which all suit this more mature sounding material. Cook’s more developed lyrics, melodic structures (he co-wrote all 12 tracks), and grittier vocal performances throughout the album abundantly display his overall growth as an artist'. Entertainment Weekly also gave the album a positive review. Entertainment Weekly stated that This Loud Morning, uses closing-credits-of-a-Michael-Bay-movie bombast too often to suffocate otherwise sweet, sometimes whimsical experiments like the album-opening Circadian.

Singles
"The Last Goodbye" was the first official single from the album and was released on April 19, 2011.
The song made its debut live on the American Idol (season 10) top 7 results show on April 21, 2011.  "The Last Goodbye" sold 22,000 copies in its first week and entered the Bubbling Under Hot 100 chart at number five.

"Fade into Me" is the second single from the album. It was released on October 10, 2011.

Track listing

Chart performance and sales
This Loud Morning debuted at number 7 on the Billboard 200 selling 46,000 copies in the United States. and at number 23 on the Canadian Albums Chart. As of August 2015 the album has sold 133,000 copies.

This Quiet Night EP

This Quiet Night, is an EP packaged with This Loud Morning fan editions available exclusively via Cook's official music store and consists of acoustic performances of select album tracks.  The CD version became available when it was released as a Walmart exclusive on February 7, 2012.

Track listing

Personnel
Band members
David Cook –  lead and backing vocals, rhythm guitar
Neal Tiemann – lead guitar, acoustic baritone guitar
Andy Skib – rhythm guitar, background vocals, piano
Monty Anderson – bass guitar
Kyle Peek – drums, backing vocals

Musicians
Jamie Muhoberac – keyboards
Kaare Kabel Mai - drums
Chris Chaney – bass guitar
Dorian Crozier – drums
Tim Pierce – acoustic guitar, rhythm guitar
Joel Shearer – acoustic guitar, rhythm guitar
Phil X – acoustic guitar, rhythm guitar
Mark Castrillon – background vocals
German Pops Orchestra
Bernd Ruf - orchestra music director
Ulrich Zimmer - orchestra contractor & Leader
Johannes Krampen – violin 1
Lisa Barry – violin 1
Michael Speth - violin 1
Klaus Kulling – violin 1
Klaus Marquardt – violin 2
Ariane Volm – violin 2
Monika Beck – violin 2
Kathrin Bscheidl – violin 2
Claudiu Rupa – violin 2
Alexander Brutsch – viola
Natascha Klotschkoff – viola
Friederike Faust – viola
Marcin Niziol – viola
Betty Bachofer – viola
Christiane Alber – violoncello
Constantin Meier – violoncello
Felix Brade – violoncello
Alex Uhl – double bass

Children Choir
Jasper Randall - Choir Contractor
Julian Babad
Christopher James
Michael O'Brien
Victor Pineschi
Hale Thornhill-Wilson

Production
Matt Serletic – Arranger, keyboards, piano, producer, programmer
Mark Dobson – Pro Tools Editor, recording engineer
Doug Trantow – Pro Tools Editor, programmer, recording engineer
Alex Arias – 2nd Engineer, engineer
Kevin Estrada – 2nd Engineer
Ryan Kern – 2nd Engineer
Mike Leisz – 2nd Engineer, engineer
Kelle Musgrove - Production Coordinator
Justin Niebank – Mixing Engineer
Andrew Bollman – Assistant mixing engineer
Seth Morton - Assistant mixing engineer
Tim Palmer – Mixing engineer
Travis Kennedy – Assistant mixing engineer
Cindi Peters - Mix Coordinator
Rune Westberg - Composer, Guitar, Producer (bonus track 14), Recording Engineer
Bob Ludwig - Mastering
Adrian von Ripka - Tonmeister
Bettina Bertok - Assistant
Rokulus Strings
Rok Golob - Conductor and Orchestrator
Mojca Arnold – Violin
Ziga Cerar - Violin
Marija Naversnik – Violin
Nastja Znideric –  Violin
Marijana Gregoric – Violin
Andreja Zupanc – Violin
Ajda Kralj – Violin
Tamar Tasev - Viola
Marjeta Skrjanc – Viola
Pavel Rakar – Acoustic Cello
Ursula Ivanus – Acoustic Cello
Tomaz Stular – Contrabass

Release history

References

2011 albums
19 Recordings albums
Albums produced by Matt Serletic
David Cook (singer) albums
RCA Records albums